Sebastian Schwarz may refer to:
 Sebastian Schwarz (volleyball), German volleyball player
 Sebastian F. Schwarz, German-born musician, teacher and administrator